Fouvent-Saint-Andoche is a commune in the Haute-Saône department in the region of Bourgogne-Franche-Comté in eastern France.

Places and monuments
 Claude Nicolas Ledoux's design, the Royal Saltworks at Arc-et-Senans (Saline royale d'Arc-et-Senans)

See also
Communes of the Haute-Saône department

References

External links

 Fouvent-Saint-Andoche on the site of the Institut géographique national
  History of the commune at the time of World War I

Communes of Haute-Saône
Champagne (province)